James Willett (born 23 December 1995) is an Australian sports shooter. He competed in the men's double trap event at the 2016 Summer Olympics.

Willett competed in the men's trap event and also the team event with Laetisha Scanlan at the 2020 Summer Olympics. He did not score sufficient points in either event to advance past qualification.

References

External links
 

1995 births
Living people
Australian male sport shooters
Olympic shooters of Australia
Shooters at the 2016 Summer Olympics
Place of birth missing (living people)
Shooters at the 2020 Summer Olympics
21st-century Australian people